Svatopluk Buchta (born 26 February 1966) is a Czech former cyclist. He competed at the 1988 Summer Olympics and the 1992 Summer Olympics.

References

External links
 

1966 births
Living people
Czech male cyclists
Olympic cyclists of Czechoslovakia
Cyclists at the 1988 Summer Olympics
Cyclists at the 1992 Summer Olympics
Sportspeople from Brno